Bernard Drainville (born June 6, 1963) is a Canadian politician, television host and journalist. He was the Member of National Assembly of Quebec for the riding of Marie-Victorin in Longueuil from 2007 to 2016, representing the Parti Québécois.

Biography
Drainville was born in La Visitation-de-l'Île-Dupas, Quebec.  He attended the University of Ottawa, where he was president of the Student Federation of the University of Ottawa in 1984-85, and obtained a bachelor's degree in political science and a master's degree in international relations at the London School of Economics.

In 1989, Drainville joined Radio-Canada as a journalist, where he worked at the Windsor affiliate. He became a correspondent for Latin America in 2001, where he was arrested once in Mexico and detained by the Revolutionary Armed Forces of Colombia. Prior to 2007, he was a television host at the network's news channel RDI and the correspondent at the National Assembly, and a correspondent for the House of Commons of Canada from 1998 to 2001. He hosted the City of Montreal mayoral debate between Gérald Tremblay and Pierre Bourque during the 2005 municipal election campaign.

Drainville jumped into provincial politics and was elected in the 2007 elections in Marie-Victorin and was named the PQ's critic in health. He was re-elected in the 2008 and 2012 general elections.

On September 19, 2012, he became Minister responsible for Democratic Institutions and Active Citizenship under the Marois government. He was responsible for introducing the controversial Quebec Charter of Values, which would have banned state employees from wearing religious symbols.

He was re-elected in 2014, despite his party's defeat and was appointed the official opposition critic for energy and natural resources.

On October 20, 2014, he declared his candidacy for the Parti Québécois leadership election but dropped out on April 22, 2015 and endorsed  Pierre-Karl Péladeau.

On September 7, 2015, he was appointed the Opposition House leader by Péladeau.

On June 13, 2016, he announced he was leaving politics, saying that Mr. Péladeau's departure had prompted a reflection on his own career. He is going back to work in the media, co-hosting with Éric Duhaime a noon hour radio show on FM93 in Quebec City.

On June 7, 2022, it was announced that Drainville was running as a candidate for the CAQ in Lévis in the upcoming 2022 Quebec general election.

Notes and references

External links

 
 PQ webpage 

1963 births
Alumni of the London School of Economics
Canadian television news anchors
Canadian television reporters and correspondents
French Quebecers
Living people
Parti Québécois MNAs
Coalition Avenir Québec MNAs
Members of the Executive Council of Quebec
University of Ottawa alumni
People from Lanaudière
21st-century Canadian politicians
Critics of multiculturalism